Selections from the Arista Years is a compilation album that chronicles the Grateful Dead's studio and live albums during their time with Arista Records. This is a one-CD sampler sent to radio stations, record stores, and print media outlets by Arista to promote The Arista Years, which had come out several months earlier. As with The Arista Years, the album contains tracks from Terrapin Station, Shakedown Street, Go to Heaven, In the Dark, and Built to Last, and does not contain any new or expanded recordings.

Track listing
"Estimated Prophet" (Barlow, Weir) – 5:37
"Passenger" (Lesh, Monk) – 2:49
Tracks 1–2 originally released on the album Terrapin Station.
"Shakedown Street" (Garcia, Hunter) – 4:59
"Fire on the Mountain" (Hart, Hunter) – 3:46
"I Need a Miracle" (Barlow, Weir) – 3:33
Tracks 3–5 originally released on the album Shakedown Street.
"Alabama Getaway" (Garcia, Hunter) – 3:35
Track 6 originally released on the album Go to Heaven.
"Touch of Grey" (Garcia, Hunter) – 5:48
"Hell in a Bucket" (Barlow, Weir) – 5:36
"West L.A. Fadeaway" (Garcia, Hunter) – 6:37
"Throwing Stones" (Barlow, Weir) – 7:19
"Black Muddy River" (Garcia, Hunter) – 5:57
Tracks 7–11 originally released on the album In the Dark.
"Foolish Heart" (Garcia, Hunter) – 5:10
"Built to Last" (Garcia, Hunter) – 5:03
"Picasso Moon" (Barlow, Bralove, Weir) – 6:40
"Standing on the Moon" (Garcia, Hunter) – 5:20
Tracks 12–15 originally released on the album Built to Last.

Personnel
Grateful Dead
Jerry Garcia – guitar, vocals
Donna Jean Godchaux – vocals
Keith Godchaux – keyboards, vocals
Mickey Hart – drums
Bill Kreutzmann – drums
Phil Lesh – bass
Brent Mydland – keyboards, vocals
Bob Weir – guitar, vocals

Additional performers
Jordan Amarantha – percussion on "Fire On The Mountain"
Matthew Kelly – harmonica, harp on "I Need A Miracle"
Tom Scott – saxophone, lyricon on "Estimated Prophet"

Production
Jerry Garcia, Lowell George – producers
Bob Bralove – programming, associate producer
Betty Cantor-Jackson, John Cutler, Dan Healy, Gary Lyons, Keith Olsen – producers, engineers
Guy Charbonneau, David DeVore, Tom Flye, Justin Kreutzmann, Bob Matthews, Peter Miller, Jeffrey Norman, David Roberts, Jeff Sterling, Pete Thea, Chris Wiskes – engineers
Amy Finkle, Stanley Mouse, Gilbert Shelton, Jim Welch – art directors
Joe Gastwirt – remastering, digital remastering
Rick Griffin – illustrations
John Kahn – associate producer, horn arrangements
Cameron Sears – coordination
Bob Seidemann – photography
Christopher Stern – design
Robbie Taylor – production manager

References

Grateful Dead compilation albums
1997 compilation albums
Arista Records compilation albums
Albums with cover art by Rick Griffin